MUD2 is the successor of MUD1, Richard Bartle's pioneering Multi-User Dungeon. Rather than a sequel, it is the result of over 20 years of continuous development, and is still largely based on the game's original code.

The game is nominally a roleplaying game, with a very strict set of rules, character classes and levels. Character progress up a ladder of 11 levels until they reach the traditional MUD goal of wiz (wizard or witch).

Characters move between locations, or game rooms, using compass directions, and basic commands such as GET LONGSWORD, GET DIAMOND, KILL DWARF WITH LONGSWORD. Points are scored by dropping treasure in the room known as the swamp, killing an NPC, or killing another player. The game also includes magical powers, which are gained through a mystical artifact known as The Touchstone. The small side effect of this is that touching the Touchstone may kill you, with the likelihood of death decreasing as you get higher in level. In order to make Wiz, one must also complete seven of eight tasks. Among wizzes' many powers is the ability to instantly kill any player in the land, using the much-vaunted Finger of Death, or FOD.

The game's levels are laid out as follows:

It is generally acknowledged that the biggest challenge in the game is other players, and highly skilled players that have made wiz will actively test "mortal" players to ensure they have the required level of skill to complete, and then manage the game.

Much of MUD2's long-running appeal comes from its much-celebrated depth, and its wide-ranging gameplay, as it contains large elements of puzzle-solving and exploration, as well as elements of skill, chance, and humour.

External links
Version of MUD2 based in England
Version of MUD2 based in Canada
Richard Bartle's site, containing a wealth of MUD information
Mud2 magazine

1985 video games
Role-playing video games
MUD games
Mainframe games
Video games developed in the United Kingdom